First Place Hamilton, is a 25-storey, (78.0 m), seniors retirement apartment building in Hamilton, Ontario, Canada, which was built in 1976. It is the 15th-tallest building in Hamilton. This high rise is situated at the corner of King and Wellington Street South which was the original site of the First United Church, which burned down in 1969.

Described as an active living community that's provided comfortable home and services for seniors in Hamilton for over 3-decades. The property also includes a variety store, post office, pharmacy, restaurants, garden, and faith-based and recreation programs.

Images

See also
List of tallest buildings in Hamilton, Ontario

References

External links
Hamilton Skyscraper page- diagrams
3d model of First Place at sketchup.google.com

Buildings and structures completed in 1976
Buildings and structures in Hamilton, Ontario
Modernist architecture in Canada